Parisutham Institute of Technology and Science (PITS) is an engineering institution in Thanjavur, Tamil Nadu, India. The institution is approved by the All India Council for Technical Education (AICTE) & is affiliated to Anna University, Chennai. The institution had earlier been affiliated to Anna University of Technology, Tiruchirappalli before the merger on 15 September 2011.

Accreditation 
The institution has been accredited with NAAC 'A' GRADE by the National Assessment & Accreditation Council (NAAC) in December 2021 in the very first cycle of NAAC peer team visit.

It was founded in 2008 by Mr. S P Anthonisamy, entrepreneur and a member of the Parisutham Nadar family in Thanjavur. PITS provides technical education in the fields of Engineering and Management. It is a self-financing, minority institution.

Departments 
 School of Science and Humanities: English, Mathematics, Physics and Chemistry
 School of Computing Technology and Engineering: Civil Engineering, Computer Science and Engineering, Mechanical Engineering, Aeronautical Engineering, Electrical and Electronics Engineering, and Communication Engineering

Centres for curricular activities 
 Incubation Cell and Placement Centre
 Digital Knowledge Centre
 Centre for Language Learning

References

External links 
 

Engineering colleges in Tamil Nadu
Colleges affiliated to Anna University
Education in Thanjavur
Educational institutions established in 2008
2008 establishments in Tamil Nadu